Caffeine dependence is the condition of having a substance dependence on caffeine, a commonplace central nervous system stimulant drug which occurs naturally in coffee, tea, yerba mate, cocoa, and other plants. Caffeine is also one of the most common additives in many consumer products, including pills and beverages such as caffeinated alcoholic beverages, energy drinks, colas. In fact, studies have found that 89 percent of adults in the U.S consume on average 200 mg of caffeine daily. Cultural influence is a large factor in deciding how and what way caffeine is used. For example, in African, Asian and Pacific countries, tea is the popular form of caffeine, whilst in Europe and North America, coffee is the mainstream choice. 

Caffeine's mechanism of action is somewhat different from that of cocaine and the substituted amphetamines; caffeine blocks adenosine receptors A1 and A2A. Adenosine is a by-product of cellular activity, and stimulation of adenosine receptors produces feelings of tiredness and the need to sleep. Caffeine's ability to block these receptors means the levels of the body's natural stimulants, dopamine and norepinephrine, continue at higher levels.

The Diagnostic and Statistical Manual of Mental Disorders describes four caffeine-related disorders including intoxication, withdrawal, anxiety, and sleep.

Dependence
Mild physical dependence can result from long-term caffeine use.  Caffeine addiction, or a pathological and compulsive form of use, has been documented in humans.

Addiction vs. dependence  
Caffeine use is classified as a dependence, not an addiction. For a drug to be considered addictive, it must activate the brain's reward circuit. Caffeine, like addictive drugs, enhances dopamine signaling in the brain (is eugeroic), but not enough to activate the brain's reward circuit like addictive substances such as cocaine, morphine, and nicotine. Caffeine dependence forms due to caffeine antagonizing the adenosine A2A receptor, effectively blocking adenosine from the adenosine receptor site. This delays the onset of drowsiness and releases dopamine. As of right now, caffeine withdrawal qualifies as a psychiatric condition by the American Psychiatric Association, but caffeine use disorder does not.

Studies have demonstrated that people who take in a minimum of 100mg of caffeine per day (about the amount in one cup of coffee) can acquire a physical dependence that would trigger withdrawal symptoms that include headaches, muscle pain and stiffness, lethargy, nausea, vomiting, depressed mood, and marked irritability.  Professor Roland R. Griffiths, a professor of neurology at Johns Hopkins in Baltimore, strongly believes that caffeine withdrawal should be classified as a psychological disorder. His research suggested that withdrawal affects 50% of habitual coffee drinkers, beginning within 12–24 hours after cessation of caffeine intake, and peaking in 20–48 hours, lasting as long as 9 days.

Continued exposure to caffeine leads the body to create more adenosine-receptors in the central nervous system, which makes it more sensitive to the effects of adenosine. It reduces the stimulatory effects of caffeine by increasing tolerance, and it increases the withdrawal symptoms of caffeine as the body becomes more sensitive to the effects of adenosine once caffeine intake decreases. Caffeine tolerance develops very quickly. Tolerance to the sleep disruption effects of caffeine were seen after consumption of 400mg of caffeine 3times a day for 7days, whereas complete tolerance was observed after consumption of 300mg taken 3times a day for 18days.

Physiological effects 
Caffeine dependence can cause a person to suffer different physiological effects. Commonly known caffeine withdrawal symptoms include fatigue, lost of focus, mood swings, lack of motivation, nausea, flu, headache, tension, backache and joint pain which can range from mild to severe that are dependent on the amount of caffeine consumed daily. These symptoms may occur within 12-24 hours and can last well up to two to nine days.  Tests are still being done to get a better understanding of the effects that occur to someone when he or she becomes dependent on different forms of caffeine to make it through the day. There has been research findings that suggest that the circadian cycle is not significantly changed under popular practices of caffeine consumption in the morning and during the afternoon.

Adults 
Caffeine is consumed daily by many people and from this practice a dependence is formed. For the most part caffeine consumption is safe, symptoms or negative effects such as toxicity, compromise of bone structural health, and cardiovascular disease isn't believed to be connected to with caffeine consumption when under the 400mg threshold. On the other hand consuming over 400 mg of caffeine has shown adverse physiological and psychological effects; especially in people that have pre-existing conditions. When adults form a dependence on caffeine, it can cause a range of health problems such as headaches, insomnia, dizziness, cardiac issues, hypertension, and anxiety.

Pregnancy 
If pregnant, it is recommended not to consume over 200 mg of caffeine a day (though relative to the physical of the person). If a pregnant female consumes high levels of caffeine, it can result in low birth weights due to loss of blood flow to the placenta which could lead to an increase in health problems later in that child's life. It can also result in premature labor, reduced fertility, and other reproductive issues. If a woman is dependent on an excessive amount of caffeine to get her through the day, it is recommended that she talk to her healthcare provider to either eliminate the dependency of caffeine or to become less dependent on it.

Children and teenagers 
According to the American Academy of Pediatrics (AAP), it is not recommended for children under the age of 18 to consume several caffeinated drinks in one day. If they were to consume caffeine, it is recommended to follow some guidelines so they do not consume too much throughout the day. Such guidelines is commonly lacking in actual strategies to incorporate in to daily life. If they do not follow, they can become dependent on caffeine and without it can suffer many different side effects. These include increase of heart rate and blood pressure, sleep disturbance, mood swings, and acidic problems. Long lasting problems on children's nervous system and cardiovascular system are currently unknown, and studies are still being conducted on it. Some research has suggested that caffeinated drinks should not focus on children as their target audience or to be consumed by children.

Tolerance 
Tolerance levels regarding caffeine typically vary from person to person. Caffeine tolerance occurs when the stimulatory effects of caffeine decrease over time due to regular consumption. According to H.P. Ammon from the National Library of Medicine, caffeine tolerance occurs when the body responds to an intake of caffeine through the up-regulation of adenosine-receptors.

References

External links 

Caffeine
Substance dependence